Tele2 UK Services was the United Kingdom based Carrier Services arm of Tele2.

History
In 2000 a new telecommunications firm, Alpha Telecom Communications Limited launched in the United Kingdom. In 2003, Tele2 acquired Alpha Telecom and by the end of the same year had begun marketing services under the Tele2 brand.

Sale To The Carphone Warehouse plc.
In 2005, it was announced that Tele2's UK & Ireland operations had been sold to The Carphone Warehouse plc. for £8.7m million. The Carphone Warehouse plc. would later rebrand all Tele2 services in the UK and Ireland under their TalkTalk brand.

Notes

Telecommunications companies of the United Kingdom